An election to the Aberdeen Corporation was held on 1 May 1973, alongside municipal elections across Scotland. 12 of the corporation's 36 seats were up for election.

The election saw Labour remain in control of the corporation, winning 6 seats, giving them a total of 23. The Conservative won 5 seats, including one gained from 89-year-old Independent councillor George Roberts, contributing to a total of 12 after the election. Nigel Lindsay caused a major upset when he became the first ever Liberal to be elected to the corporation, unseating the Labour group's leader Thomas Paine in St Machar ward.

Ward results

The Glasgow Herald printed the results for Rubislaw and Ruthrieston as the same, with incomplete results for Rubislaw.

The Glasgow Herald printed the results for Rubislaw and Ruthrieston as the same, with incomplete results for Rubislaw.

References 

1973 Scottish local elections
Aberdeen City Council elections
20th century in Aberdeen